Bucculatrix diacapna is a moth in the family Bucculatricidae. It was described by Edward Meyrick in 1920. It is found in north-western Persia.

References

Natural History Museum Lepidoptera generic names catalog

Bucculatricidae
Moths described in 1920
Taxa named by Edward Meyrick